Selwyn Cudjoe (born 1 December 1943) is a Trinidad and Tobago academic, scholar, historian, essayist and editor who is Professor of Africana Studies at Wellesley College. He was also the Margaret E. Deffenbaugh and LeRoy T. Carlson Professor in Comparative Literature and the Marion Butler McClean Professor in the History of Ideas at Wellesley. Cudjoe's particular expertise is Caribbean literature and Caribbean intellectual history, and he teaches courses on the African-American literary tradition, African literature, black women writers, and Caribbean literature.

Life and career
Selwyn Reginald Cudjoe was born in Tacarigua, Trinidad and Tobago, like several generations of his family, growing up on a sugar estate on which ancestors of his had worked. His parents were Lionel R. and Carmen Rose Cudjoe; his great-grandfather, Jonathon Cudjoe, was born in Tacarigua in 1833, the last year of formal slavery, and his great-grandmother, Amelia, was born in the same village in 1837.

Cudjoe attended Tacarigua EC School, before migrating to the US in 1964, at the age of 21. He continued his studies at Fordham University, where he received a B.A. in English (1969) and an M.A. in American Literature (1972), attended Columbia University (1971–72), and subsequently earned a Ph.D. in American Literature from Cornell University (1976). He has taught at Ithaca College and at Cornell, Harvard, Brandeis, Fordham, and Ohio universities, before joining the Wellesley College faculty in 1986. Cudjoe has also been a lecturer at Auburn State Prison and taught at Bedford-Stuyvesant Youth-In-Action.

He has served as a director of the Central Bank of Trinidad and Tobago and as the president of the National Association for the Empowerment of African People (Trinidad and Tobago).

Writing
Among the many books Cudjoe has written are Caribbean Visionary: A. R. F. Webber and the Making of the Guyanese Nation (2011), The Role of Resistance in Caribbean Literature (2010), and Beyond Boundaries: The Intellectual Tradition of Trinidad and Tobago in the Nineteenth Century (2002). His 2018 book, The Slavemaster of Trinidad: William Hardin Burnley and the Nineteenth-Century Atlantic World, is described by Henry Louis Gates, Jr as a "beautifully written and meticulously researched account of Burnley’s life" that "unfolds the story of a planter who was born in America, educated in England, and made his fortune in the Caribbean. Measured in tone, this book not only exposes Burnley’s public and private racism, but also places his life in context of the greater historical currents of the first half of the 19th century Atlantic world. Cudjoe has written a volume essential to a full understanding of the history of Trinidad." According to Trinidad and Tobago Prime Minister Keith Rowley, "Cudjoe’s new book should be used as a teaching tool in all schools across the country." The Slavemaster of Trinidad was announced on the 2019 longlist for the OCM Bocas Prize for Caribbean Literature.

Cudjoe has edited a number of titles including Caribbean Women Writers, an anthology of essays collected from the first international conference on Caribbean women writers, which he organised at Wellesley College in 1988,<ref>[http://www.acwws.org/conference.php The Association of Caribbean Women Writers and Scholars.]</ref> and, most recently, Narratives of Amerindians in Trinidad and Tobago; or, Becoming Trinbagonian (2016),"The Amerindian Identity Of Trinidad And Tobago", Jamaica Gleaner, 10 April 2016. "a fascinating compendium of key documents on the narration of the Amerindian presence in Trinidad".

Cudjoe writes a weekly column in the TnT Mirror,Dr. Selwyn R. Cudjoe" at Trinicenter. and his work has appeared in many other publications, including The New York Times, The Washington Post, Boston Globe, International Herald Tribune, Baltimore Sun, Amsterdam News, Trinidad and Tobago Review, Callaloo, New Left Review, Harvard Educational Review, Essence, Trinidad Guardian and Trinidad Express.

He has also written several documentaries, including Tacarigua: A Village in Trinidad and Caribbean Women Writers (1994), and hosted programmes for Trinidad and Tobago Television.

Selected bibliography
 Resistance and Caribbean Literature, Ohio University Press, 1982, 
 Movement of the People: Essays on independence, Calaloux Publications, 1983, 
 A Just and Moral Society, Calaloux Publications, 1984, 
 V. S. Naipaul: A Materialist Reading, University of Massachusetts Press, 1988, 
 Grenada: Two Essays, Calaloux Publications, 1990, 
 Tacarigua: A Village in Trinidad, Calaloux Publications, 1995, 
 Beyond Boundaries: The Intellectual Tradition of Trinidad and Tobago in the Nineteenth Century, University of Massachusetts Press, 2002, 
 Indian Time Ah Come in Trinidad and Tobago, Calaloux Publications, 2010, 
 The Role of Resistance in Caribbean Literature, Nabu Press, 2010, ; HardPress Publishing, 2013, 
 Caribbean Visionary: A. R. F. Webber and the Making of the Guyanese Nation, University Press of Mississippi, 2011, 
 Preserving the Tacarigua Savannah: Respecting Our Heritage, 2013
 The Slavemaster of Trinidad: William Hardin Burnley and the Nineteenth-Century Atlantic World, University of Massachusetts Press, 2018, 

Edited books
 Caribbean Women Writers: Essays from the First International Conference, Calaloux Publications/University of Massachusetts Press, 1991, 
 Eric E. Williams Speaks: Essays on Colonialism and Independence, University of Massachusetts Press, 1993, 
 (With William E. Cain) C.L.R.James: His Intellectual Legacies, University of Massachusetts Press, 1995, 
 Narratives of Amerindians in Trinidad and Tobago; or, Becoming Trinbagonian'', 2016, .

References

External links
 "Africana Studies and Comparative Literature Professor Brings Expertise Beyond Walls of Academe" (Q & A with Selwyn Cudjoe), Wellesley College, 10 August 2012.
 Dr. Selwyn R. Cudjoe" at Trinicenter.
 "a narrative media presents: Professor Selwyn Cudjoe". Selwyn Cudjoe talks about his early years, academic life and profound memories. Vimeo, 2013
 "Narratives of Amerindians in Trinidad and Tobago; or, Becoming Trinbagonian" launch at SOAS (video).
 Twitter @ProfessorCudjoe

1943 births
Living people
20th-century essayists
20th-century male writers
20th-century Trinidad and Tobago historians
21st-century African-American writers
21st-century American historians
21st-century American male writers
21st-century essayists
21st-century male writers
African-American historians
African-American male writers
American male non-fiction writers
Anthologists
Columbia Graduate School of Arts and Sciences alumni
Cornell University alumni
Fordham University alumni
Historians of the Caribbean
Male essayists
Male non-fiction writers
Trinidad and Tobago academics
Trinidad and Tobago columnists
Trinidad and Tobago emigrants to the United States
Trinidad and Tobago essayists
Trinidad and Tobago journalists
Trinidad and Tobago male writers
Trinidad and Tobago non-fiction writers
Wellesley College faculty